Julian Rufidis (born 6 July 2000) is a German footballer who plays as a midfielder for Regionalliga Nord club TSV Havelse.

Career
Rufidis made his professional debut for TSV Havelse in the 3. Liga on 14 August 2021 against 1. FC Magdeburg.

References

External links
 
 
 
 

2000 births
Living people
German footballers
Footballers from Hanover
Association football midfielders
Hannover 96 II players
TSV Havelse players
3. Liga players
Regionalliga players